The Vega Aircraft Corporation was a subsidiary of the Lockheed Aircraft Company in Burbank, California responsible for much of its parent company's production in World War II.

History
The company was first formed in August 1937 as the AiRover Company to produce a new light aircraft design. It was renamed in May 1938 to honor Lockheed's first aircraft design, the Vega.

The AiRover Model 1 was a Lockheed Altair fitted with a Menasco Unitwin 2-544 engine, which featured two engines driving a single shaft. The AiRover Model 2 was a new design named the Vega Starliner. One Starliner prototype was built and tested, but the design did not go into production.

In 1940, with World War II already underway in Europe, Vega changed its focus from light aircraft to military aircraft. The company began by producing five North American NA-35 trainers under license with North American Aviation. Production by Vega really got underway with the Hudson, a patrol bomber designed for use by the Royal Air Force.

Vega entered a partnership between three companies (the other two being Boeing and Douglas) (abbreviated BVD) to produce the Boeing B-17 Flying Fortress. Of over 12,000 B-17s produced by war's end, 2,750 were built by Vega. The company also built two experimental B-17 variants, the Boeing XB-38 Flying Fortress and the Boeing YB-40 Flying Fortress.

By the end of November 1943, Vega had merged back into Lockheed, having far surpassed its original mission of producing light aircraft.

Aircraft

See also
Lockheed Vega
California during World War II

References

Notes

Bibliography

 Francillon, René J, Lockheed Aircraft since 1913. Naval Institute Press: Annapolis, 1987.
 Yenne, Bill, Lockheed. Crescent Books, 1987.

External links

 Menasco 2-544 Unitwin Aircraft Engine – Old Machine Press

Lockheed Corporation
Aerospace companies of the United States
Defense companies of the United States
Defunct aircraft manufacturers of the United States
Manufacturing companies based in California
Companies based in Burbank, California
Manufacturing companies established in 1937
Manufacturing companies disestablished in 1943
1937 establishments in California
1943 disestablishments in California